David John Jessup (born 7 March 1953 in Ipswich, England) is a former speedway rider who finished runner-up the Speedway World Championship in 1980 to fellow countryman Michael Lee. The same season he won the World Pairs Championship with Peter Collins and became British Speedway Champion after finishing runner-up in 1978 and third in 1979. He also won the London Riders' Championship in 1975, despite being in his fourth season with Leicester Lions, and the World Team Cup with England in 1974, 1977 and 1980.

During his career which commenced in 1969 he rode for Eastbourne Eagles, West Ham Hammers, Wembley Lions, Reading Racers, Leicester Lions, King's Lynn Stars, Wimbledon Dons and Mildenhall Fen Tigers.

World final appearances

Individual World Championship
 1974 -  Göteborg, Ullevi - 13th - 5pts
 1978 -  London, Wembley Stadium - 4th - 11pts + 2pts
 1979 -  Chorzów, Silesian Stadium - 8th - 8pts
 1980 -  Göteborg, Ullevi - 2nd - 12pts + 3pts
 1981 -  London, Wembley Stadium - 8th - 7pts
 1982 -  Los Angeles, Memorial Coliseum - 6th - 8pts

World Pairs Championship
 1974 -  Manchester, Hyde Road (with Peter Collins) - 4th - 20pts (8)
 1980 -  Krsko, Matija Gubec Stadium (with Peter Collins) - Winner - 29pts (15)
 1981 -  Chorzów, Silesian Stadium (with Chris Morton) - 6th - 17pts (7)

World Team Cup
 1974 -  Chorzów, Silesian Stadium (with Peter Collins / John Louis / Malcolm Simmons) - Winner - 42pts (10)
 1977 -  Wrocław, Olympic Stadium (with Peter Collins / Michael Lee / John Davis / Malcolm Simmons) - Winner - 37pts (9)
 1978 -  Landshut, Stadion Ellermühle (with Malcolm Simmons / Peter Collins / Gordon Kennett / Michael Lee) - 2nd - 27pts (5)
 1980 -  Wrocław, Olympic Stadium (with Peter Collins / Chris Morton / Michael Lee) - Winner - 40pts (8)
 1981 -  Olching, Olching Speedwaybahn (with Chris Morton / Kenny Carter / John Davis / Gordon Kennett) - 2nd - 29pts (3)
 1983 -  Vojens, Speedway Center (with Kenny Carter / Michael Lee / Chris Morton / Peter Collins) - 2nd 29pts (2)

References

1953 births
Living people
British speedway riders
English motorcycle racers
British Speedway Championship winners
Sportspeople from Ipswich
Reading Racers riders
King's Lynn Stars riders
West Ham Hammers riders
Leicester Lions riders
Wimbledon Dons riders
Wembley Lions riders
Eastbourne Eagles riders
Mildenhall_Fen_Tigers_riders
Speedway World Pairs Champions